Kjærgaard is a Danish surname. In 2013, there were 3,408 people in Denmark with this surname.

Notable people with this surname include:
 Annika Kjærgaard (born 1971), Swedish singer
 Mie Olise Kjærgaard 
 Steffen Kjærgaard (born 1973), Norwegian cyclist
 Tonje Kjærgaard (born 1975), Danish handball player
 Dagny Kjærgaard (born 1933), Catholic theologian

References

See also
Kierkegaard

Danish-language surnames